Goala, Burkina Faso is a town in the Pella Department of Boulkiemdé Province in central western Burkina Faso. It has a population of 3,981.

Goala is in the Sahara desert. It gets very hot.

References

External links
Satellite map at Maplandia.com

Populated places in Boulkiemdé Province